Vitaly Novichenko (born 16 April 1975) is a Belarusian former speed skater. He competed at the 1994 Winter Olympics and the 1998 Winter Olympics.

References

External links
 

1975 births
Living people
Belarusian male speed skaters
Olympic speed skaters of Belarus
Speed skaters at the 1994 Winter Olympics
Speed skaters at the 1998 Winter Olympics
Sportspeople from Minsk